Hoda Lattaf (born 31 August 1978 in Bordeaux) is a French football player who plays in attack. She currently plays for Montpellier in the top French league and is one of the leading players for the France national team, and was seen as the preferred partner for Marinette Pichon until the latter decided to retire from international soccer.

Club career
Lattaf joined Olympique Lyonnais in the summer of 2006, after 6 seasons with Montpellier HSC, during which she won the title in 2004 and 2005. Lattaf was the second highest scorer in the 2005/2006 season after Marinette Pichon.

International career
Since making her debut on 22 November 1997, Lattaf has played 98 time for her country, scoring 26 goals (as of 26 May 2006), and appeared in the 2001 UEFA Championships, the 2003 World Cup and the 2005 UEFA Championships. The France team failed to qualify for the 2007 World Cup after Lattaf scored an own goal against England on 30 September 2006.

References
 Info from the MFFF website
Hoda Lattaf page on the French Wikipedia, accessed 17 November 2006

External links
 
 

1978 births
Living people
Footballers from Bordeaux
French women's footballers
French sportspeople of Moroccan descent
Olympique Lyonnais Féminin players
Montpellier HSC (women) players
FIFA Century Club
France women's international footballers
2003 FIFA Women's World Cup players
Women's association football forwards
Division 1 Féminine players